Pitnak is a city in Xorazm Region, Uzbekistan. It is the seat of Tuproqqalʼa District. The town population was 12,411 people in 1989, and 16,800 in 2016.

References

Populated places in Xorazm Region
Cities in Uzbekistan